The Stadskanaal–Zuidbroek railway is a railway line in the Netherlands, running from Stadskanaal to Zuidbroek, passing through Veendam. The line was opened in 1910, and closed in 1953, but the Veendam-Zuidbroek section was reopened in 2011. The Stadskanaal-Veendam section is owned by the STAR museum railway, and mostly runs using steam trains.

Stations

Train service
Services on the Veendam-Zuidbroek line are operated by Arriva. From Monday to Saturday, trains run every thirty minutes between 5am and 8pm. At all other times trains run hourly.

References

External links

 STAR
 www.sporenplan.nl

Railway lines in Groningen (province)
Heritage railways in the Netherlands